Chauncey Delos Beadle (August 5, 1866 in St. Catharines, Ontario – 1950) was a Canadian-born botanist and horticulturist active in the southern United States.  He was educated in horticulture at Ontario Agricultural College (1884) and Cornell University (1889).  In 1890 the landscape architect Frederick Law Olmsted hired him to oversee the nursery at Biltmore Estate in Asheville, North Carolina on a temporary basis. Olmsted had been impressed by Beadle's "encyclopedic" knowledge of plants.  Beadle ended up working at Biltmore for more than 60 years, until his death in 1950. He is best known for his horticultural work with azaleas, and described several species and varieties of plants from the southern Appalachian region. He and three friends, including his "driver and companion" Sylvester Owens, styled themselves the Azalea Hunters. The group traveled over the eastern United States for a period of fifteen years, studying and collecting native plants. In 1940 Beadle donated his entire collection of 3,000 plants to Biltmore Estates.

He also designed the landscape at Gunston Hall, Biltmore Forest, North Carolina and Intheoaks at Black Mountain, North Carolina.

Beadle wrote scientific papers describing new species and varieties of North American plants, for example, papers in the journal Biltmore Botanical Studies and his major work on the genus Crataegus (hawthorns) in John Kunkel Small's 1903 book Flora of the Southeastern United States. (See, for example,  to the scientific description of Florida Mock-orange, Philadelphus floridus.) Two of his important collaborators at Biltmore were Charles Lawrence Boynton and Frank Ellis Boynton. In popular literature, Beadle wrote the Introduction for Alice Lounsberry's Southern Wildflowers and Trees.

References

External links 

 
 
 
 
 
 Denizens of Biltmore—has photo of Beadle, accessed 9 January 2008
 Alice Lounsberry (1901). Southern Wild Flowers and Trees (foreword by Chauncey Beadle). New York: Frederick A. Stokes Company.
 Rachel Carley (1994). A Guide to Biltmore Estate. Asheville, North Carolina: The Biltmore Company. . 116 pages.
 View works by Chauncey Beadle at Biodiversity Heritage Library.

Cornell University College of Agriculture and Life Sciences alumni
1866 births
1950 deaths
People from St. Catharines
19th-century American botanists
19th-century Canadian botanists
20th-century American botanists
20th-century Canadian botanists